The Y. M. Rizer House, also known as Mapleshade, is an Italianate and Second Empire style house dating from c.1874 in Franklin, Tennessee that was listed on the National Register of Historic Places in 1988.

According to a 1988 study of Williamson County historical resources, it is one of a handful of notable, historic Italianate style residences in the county, others being the James Wilhoite House, the John Hunter House, the Owen-Cox House, the Andrew C. Vaughn House, the Henry Pointer House, the Jordan-Williams House, and the Thomas Critz House.

References

Houses on the National Register of Historic Places in Tennessee
Houses in Franklin, Tennessee
Second Empire architecture in Tennessee
Houses completed in 1874
National Register of Historic Places in Williamson County, Tennessee